Close Your Eyes Before It's Dark is a 2016 Taiwanese mystery thriller created and produced by TTV. Directed by Ke Zhen-Nian and Chen Yu-hsun, it is the fourth installment in the anthology series Qseries and premiered on December 30, 2016.

The series revolves around eight friends who were classmates and members of the mountain-climbing club from ten years ago and their venture into a mountain to uncover truths from the past. The ensemble and supporting cast include Bryan Chang as Lu Bo-Cang, Jian Man-shu as Jung Xiao-Tong, Yen Tsao as Chou Ruo-Qing, Sun Ke-Fang as Liu Cheng-Fang, Allen Chen as Lan Yi-Cong, Jake Hsu as Li Zi-Shuo, Chu Sheng-Ping as Huang Yu-Xiu, Lan Ya-Yun as Bai Xin-Yi, Huang Shang-Ho as Wang Guang-Wei, and Huang Di-Yang as Chen Ya-Zheng. Filming took place primarily in Miaoli, Taiwan.

Premise
The series focuses on eight friends who were members of the mountain-climbing club in high school ten years ago. Due to a photo scandal, most of them have lost contact with one another and a gulf of distrust lies between each of them. In the present, they meet up in a mountain cabin and attempt to dig up time capsules they had buried ten years before, only to find out someone had already dug them. Unbeknownst to them, a darker conspiracy is lurking after them, and finding the truth could lead to deadly consequences.

Cast
Bryan Chang as Lu Bo-Cang: One of the members of the mountain-climbing club in high school. He is now a surgeon in practice and is married to Cheng-Fang, whom he was in love with since ten years ago.
Jian Man-shu as Hung Xiao-Tong: One of the members of the mountain-climbing club in high school. She was expelled from high school due to a photo scandal with Yi-Cong, her then-boyfriend. She is now a model.
Yen Tsao as Chou Ruo-Qing: One of the members of the mountain-climbing club in high school. He actively participates in grassroots movements.
Sun Ke-Fang as Liu Cheng-Fang: One of the members of the mountain-climbing club in high school. She was a close friend of Xiao-Tong and is now married to Bo-Cang.
Allen Chen as Lan Yi-Cong: One of the members of the mountain-climbing club in high school. Son of a wealthy businessman and was Xiao-Tong's boyfriend. After the photo scandal, he was able to stay in school due to his father's status, yet his girlfriend was expelled.
Jake Hsu as Li Zi-Shuo: The mountain-climbing club leader in high school. He has a secret that he hid for ten years.
Chu Sheng-Ping as Huang Yu-Xiu: One of the members of the mountain-climbing club in high school. She has a naive personality.
Lan Ya-Yun as Bai Xin-Yi: One of the members of the mountain-climbing club in high school. She was the trigger for the photo scandal ten years ago and was determined to find the perpetrator. She is now a prosecutor and suffers from asthma. She is also the organizer for the mountain trip.
Huang Shang-Ho as Wang Guang-Wei: Son of the mountain cabin owner.
Huang Di-Yang as Chen Ya-Zheng: A policeman. He is also Xin-Yi's boyfriend.

Soundtrack
Ending theme: "Light of Darkness 黑暗之光" by Ricie Fun

Episode ratings

Awards and nominations

References

External links
 
 

2016 Taiwanese television series debuts
2010s Taiwanese television series